

Codes

References

M